Akerman is a surname.  People with the name include:

Alexander Akerman (1869–1948), American lawyer and judge
Amos T. Akerman (1821–1880), US Attorney General
Chantal Akerman (1950-2015), Belgian film director, artist and professor
Clive Akerman (died 2013), English philatelist
Damián Akerman (born 1980), Argentine footballer
Jeremy Akerman (born 1942), Canadian politician, writer and actor
John Yonge Akerman (1806–1873), English antiquarian
Lucy Evelina Metcalf Akerman (1816–1874), American Unitarian writer
Mariano Akerman (born 1963), Argentine painter, architect and art historian
Piers Akerman (born 1950), Australian journalist and editor
Rachel Akerman (1522–1544), Austrian poet

See also
Lincoln Akerman School, an elementary school and middle school in Hampton Falls, New Hampshire, United States
Åkerman
Akkerman (disambiguation)
Ackerman (surname)
Ackermann (surname)
Akkerman (surname)
Ackermans (disambiguation)